Sant'Alessio con Vialone is a comune (municipality) in the Province of Pavia in the Italian region Lombardy, located about 30 km south of Milan and about 9 km northeast of Pavia.

Sights include the eponymous castle and the annexed natural preserve.

References

External links
Official website

Cities and towns in Lombardy